The   is a metro station located in Tsuzuki Ward, Yokohama, Kanagawa Prefecture, Japan. It is served by the Yokohama Municipal Subway’s Green Line (Line 4) and is 3.1 kilometers from the terminus of the Green Line at Nakayama Station.

History
The Tsuzuki-fureainooka Station opened on March 30, 2008 when the Green Line started operation.

Lines 
Yokohama Municipal Subway
Green Line

Station layout
Tsuzuki-fureainooka has a single underground island platform serving two tracks. The station building is located above ground.

Platforms

References

External links
 Tsuzuki-Fureai-no-Oka Station (Japanese)

Railway stations in Kanagawa Prefecture
Railway stations in Japan opened in 2008
Green Line (Yokohama)